Lepismium houlletianum is a species of plant in the family Cactaceae. It is found in Argentina, Brazil, and possibly Bolivia. Its natural habitats are subtropical or tropical moist lowland forest and subtropical or tropical moist montane forest. It is threatened by habitat loss.

References

houlletianum
Flora of Argentina
Flora of Brazil
Flora of the Atlantic Forest
Taxonomy articles created by Polbot